Alexander Paul DesRoches (born June 16, 1988) is a Canadian professional basketball player who last played for the Island Storm of the National Basketball League of Canada (NBL Canada). He played college basketball for the University of New Brunswick.

References

External links 
Alex DesRoches at RealGM
FIBA profile

1988 births
Living people
Basketball people from New Brunswick
Canadian men's basketball players
Island Storm players
Moncton Miracles players
People from Dieppe, New Brunswick
Shooting guards
Small forwards
University of New Brunswick alumni